Colle di Cadibona -  -  is a mountain pass between Savona and Altare in the Ligurian Alps, delineating the boundary with the Apennine Mountains.
It is also known as Bocchetta di Altare. On the south-eastern side of the Alps Godovič Pass (Slovenia) conventionally represents the opposite end of the Alpine range.

References

Cadibona
Province of Savona
Cadibona
Cadibona